Leysmill railway station served the village of Leysmill, Angus, Scotland from 1838 to 1955 on the Arbroath and Forfar Railway.

History 
The station opened on 24 November 1838 by the Aberdeen Railway. It closed to both passengers and goods traffic on 5 December 1955.

References

External links 

Disused railway stations in Angus, Scotland
Former Caledonian Railway stations
Railway stations in Great Britain opened in 1848
Railway stations in Great Britain closed in 1955
1848 establishments in Scotland
1955 disestablishments in Scotland